OTR-21 Tochka ( ("point")) is a Soviet tactical ballistic missile. Its GRAU designation is 9K79; its NATO reporting name is SS-21 Scarab. One missile is transported per 9P129 vehicle and raised prior to launch. It uses an inertial guidance system.

The OTR-21 forward deployment to East Germany began in 1981, replacing the earlier Luna-M series of unguided artillery rockets.

Description
The OTR-21 is a mobile missile launch system, designed to be deployed along with other land combat units on the battlefield. While the 9K52 Luna-M is large and relatively inaccurate, the OTR-21 is much smaller. The missile itself can be used for precise strikes on enemy tactical targets, such as control posts, bridges, storage facilities, troop concentrations and airfields. The fragmentation warhead can be replaced with a nuclear, biological or chemical warhead. The solid propellant makes the missile easy to maintain and deploy.

OTR-21 units are usually managed in a brigade structure. There are 18 launchers in a brigade; each launcher is provided with two or three missiles.

The vehicle is NBC-protected. The system began development in 1968. Three variants were developed.

Tochka
The initial version, Tochka (NATO reporting name Scarab A) entered service with the Soviet Army in 1975. It carried one of four types of warhead:
 9M123F unitary High explosive warhead. Weight .
 9M123K submunitions warhead. Anti-personnel, anti-armour and anti-runway submunitions available.
 9M79B nuclear. Selectable yield of 10 or 100 kT.
 9N123R EMP warhead.

Tochka-U
The improved Tochka-U (NATO reporting name Scarab B) passed state tests from 1986 to 1988 and was introduced in 1989. 

Six warhead options have been reported, a unitary high explosive warhead, an anti-personnel submunition dispenser, an anti-radar warhead, an EMP warhead and two nuclear warheads.

Scarab C
An unconfirmed third variant, designated Scarab C by NATO, may have been developed in the 1990s, but was likely never operational. Scarab C weighs .

Configuration 
 9M79 missiles with various types of warheads (-9M79-1 for Tochka U Complex).
 Launcher 9P129 or 9P129-1M (SPU);
 Transport and loading machine 9T218 or 9T128-1 (TZM);
 Transport vehicle 9T222 or 9T238 (TM);
 Automatic testing machine 9V819 or 9V819-1 (AKIM);
 Technical service vehicle 9V844 or 9V844M (MTO).
 Set of weapon equipment 9F370-1 (KAO);
Educational means:
 Simulator 9F625M;
 Missile overall weight model (such as 9M79K-GVM).
 9M79-UT training missile and 9N123F (K) -UT, 9N39-UT warhead. 9H123F-R UT;
 9M79-RM missile and 9N123K-RM missile split training model.

Operational history
 In 1994, the Yemeni government used Tochka missiles against southern forces during the 1994 Yemen civil war.
 In 1999, Russia used the missiles in the Second Chechen War.
 At least 15 Tochka missiles were deployed by Russian forces from  8 to 11 August 2008 during the 2008 South Ossetia war.
 CNN reported that at least one was used in 2014 near Donetsk during the War in Donbass by either the Ukrainian Army or the Russian-backed separatist forces. The Ukrainian army issued a statement in which they denied the use of the ballistic missile.

Syrian civil war (2011–present)
  In early December 2014, the Syrian Army fired at least one Tochka against Syrian rebels during the Siege of Wadi al-Deif (near Maarat al-Numan, in Idlib province) .
 On 26 April 2016, the Syrian Army fired a Tochka at Syrian rebels in the Syrian Civil Defense Center in west Aleppo
 On 14 June 2016, the Syrian Army fired a Tochka at Syrian rebel groups Al-Rahman Legion and Jaysh Al-Fustat in Eastern Ghouta, killing several fighters.
 On 20 March 2018, the Syrian Army fired a Tochka towards the Turkish Hatay province, which fell in the border district of Yayladağı without causing any casualties or damage.
 On 23 July 2018, the Syrian Army fired two Tochka missiles near the Israeli border. Initially thought to be inbound to Israel near the Sea of Galilee, two David's Sling interceptors were fired by Israel. A few moments later it became clear they were going to strike within Syria, as such one interceptor was detonated over Israel while the other one fell inside Syria. One Tochka missile landed 1 kilometer inside Syria.
On 5 March 2021, the Syrian Army reportedly fired a KN-02 Toksa, a North Korean copy, solid fuelled short ranged missile against a major oil facility in the country’s Idlib governorate, which is currently under the control of Turkish-backed insurgents. The strike near oil facilities ignited major blazes and killed one and wounded 11 people.

Yemeni civil war (2014–present)
 On 4 September 2015, Houthi forces fired a Tochka missile at Safir base in Marib killing over 100 Saudi-led coalition personnel.
 On 14 December 2015, Houthi forces fired another Tochka missile at Bab Al Mandab base killing over 150 Saudi-led coalition personnel stationed there.
 On 16 January 2016, Houthi forces fired a Tochka at Al Bairaq base in Marib killing dozens of Saudi-led coalition personnel 
 On 31 January 2016, Houthi forces fired a Tochka at Al Anad base in Lahj killing and wounding over 200 Saudi-led coalition personnel

2020 Nagorno-Karabakh war
 Azerbaijan claimed Armenia fired Tochka-U rockets at its territory during the 2020 Nagorno-Karabakh conflict. Armenia denied this, stating that Azerbaijan is making "disinformation to justify the use of a similar system or a system of a higher caliber."

2022 Russian invasion of Ukraine
 On 24 February 2022, Ukrainian forces launched a missile attack on Russian Millerovo Airbase in Rostov Oblast, using two Tochka-U ballistic missiles in response for the Russian invasion of Ukraine and to prevent further air strikes by the Russian air force against Ukraine. The attack left one Su-30SM destroyed on the ground.
 On 24 February 2022, a 9M79 Tochka missile fired by Russian forces struck near a hospital building in Vuhledar, Donetsk Oblast, Ukraine, killing 4 civilians and wounding 10. An Amnesty International investigation confirmed that the hospital was not a military target.
 On 14 March 2022, the Russian Federation and the government of the separatist Donetsk People Republic blamed Ukrainian forces of launching a Tochka-U missile which killed 23 civilians and wounded 28 in Donetsk. The housing facility was supposedly used as a barracks for separatists forces.
 On 19 March 2022, Russian forces claimed that they shot down a Ukrainian-fired missile near the Port of Berdiansk.
 On 24 March 2022, the Russian Navy landing ship Saratov, docked in Berdyansk port in Ukraine, caught fire and sunk. On 3 July, a Russian official confirmed the sinking of the Saratov, a Soviet era Tapir-class landing ship. The ship was hit by a Tockha-U missile. Russia claims that the ship was scuttled by its crew to prevent its munitions from exploding and that the ship has been salvaged since. 
 On 8 April 2022, the railway station in Kramatorsk under Ukrainian control was hit by two Russian Tochka-U ballistic missiles. The attack killed at least 52 civilians and injured at least 87 more. Later, Russia falsely blamed Ukraine for the strike. The message in Russian "Za detei", meaning on behalf of the children, had been daubed on the missile in white.
 On 16 June 2022, a Russian ammunition warehouse in the occupied Ukrainian city of Krasny Luch was report to have been hit by a Ukrainian Tochka-U missile.
 On 13 January 2023, Ukraine claims to have killed over 100 Russian soldiers in the Soledar area using various special forces, artillery and a Tochka-U missile.

Operators

Current operators
 3+
 4
 36 (operated by 465th Missile Brigade)
 18
 12
 Unknown numbers of KN-02 Toksa variant.
 In 2010, the Russian Army had more than 200 surface-to-surface missiles (SSMs) of various types in service; these included the Tochka which had undergone a modernization program in 2004 with the installation of a new automatic control system. As of 2019, Russia possessed 24 launchers. Russian missile systems have been upgraded since 2004 (replacing the onboard automated control systems) and were scheduled to be replaced by the 9K720 Iskander missiles. It was reported that in late 2019, the 448th Rocket Brigade, last rocket brigade operating the Tochka ballistic missiles was rearmed with the 9K720 Iskander missiles, marking the end of operation of the type with the Russian Armed Forces. However, some systems are expected to remain in use at the Kapustin Yar missile test range. Despite these claims, Russian news reports and social media footage show Russian army still displaying Tochkas at public events in 2021, including at Victory Day parade in Krasnodar. During the 2022 Russian invasion of Ukraine, it is assumed that Tochka-U launchers have been returned to service; this was denied by the Russian government. Amnesty International, the investigative journalists of the Conflict Intelligence Team, and a number of unnamed military experts had already reported the use of Tochkas by Russian forces in multiple parts of Ukraine prior to the strike on Kramatorsk. Moreover, investigators from the open-source Belarusian Hajun Project had published videos of several Russian trucks with Tochka missiles heading from Belarus to Ukraine with 'V' markings on 5 March and 30 March. In addition, the Institute for the Study of War assessed that the Russian 8th Guards Combined Arms Army, which is active in the Donbas area, is equipped with Tochka-U missiles. Last but not least, a Russian open sources filmed several TRK launchers and cargo vehicles for "Tochka-U" arriving in Melitopol in July 2022 via the LPR.
 According to the Russian Ministry of Defense, as of April 2022, Ukraine possess 38–90 Tochka missile launchers and several hundred missiles. The Center for Strategic and International Studies (CSIS) states that Ukraine has 500 Tochka-U missiles in its arsenal in 2022. Globalsecurity claims that Ukraine owns 90 Tochka-U launchers in 2022, the same amount it had in 1995.
 Inherited unknown numbers of KN-02 Toksa variant from North Korea. In February 2017, according to a Fox news report, US officials claimed Russia has also supplied 50 Tochka-U missiles to Syria. Kremlin spokesperson Dmitry Peskov claimed that Russia has no such information, and the Russian Ministry of Defense denied it.
 Inherited from North Yemen. Used during the ongoing civil war.

Former operators
 Passed on to successor states.
 Inherited from Czechoslovakia, retired.
 Passed on to Germany.
 Retired; was never operational.
 Ordered 12 launchers and around 100 missiles. Declared operational in 1988. They were used during the 1994 civil war, and were passed on to unified Yemen after.
 4 retired in 2005, because of lack of rockets and service parts.
 Inherited a small number from Czechoslovakia, all retired.
 Passed on to successor states.

See also 
 MGM-52 Lance
 9K720 Iskander
 P-12
 Prahaar (missile)
 LORA (missile)
 MGM-140 ATACMS

References

External links

 CSIS Missile Threat SS-21
 CSIS Missile Defense Project - The Missile War in Yemen
 SS-21 Scarab article on Warfare.ru
 Tochka-U Video
 SS-21 Scarab (9K79 Tochka) 
  OTR Tochka

Cold War missiles of the Soviet Union
Nuclear missiles of the Soviet Union
Tactical ballistic missiles
Theatre ballistic missiles
Chemical weapon delivery systems
KB Mashinostroyeniya products
Tactical ballistic missiles of North Korea
Tactical ballistic missiles of the Soviet Union
Military equipment introduced in the 1970s